Gonzales High School is a 4A public high school located in Gonzales, Texas (USA). It is part of the Gonzales Independent School District located in central Gonzales County. In 2011, the school was rated "Academically Unacceptable" by the Texas Education Agency.

Athletics
The Gonzales Apaches compete in the following sports:

Cross Country, Volleyball, Football, Basketball, Powerlifting, Golf, Tennis, Track, Softball & Baseball

State Titles
 Boys Basketball - 
 1974(3A)
 Boys Cross Country - 
 1991(3A), 1992(3A)
 Girls Golf - 
 1989(3A)

Notable alumni
 Dalva Allen, former NFL defensive end for the Houston Oilers and the Oakland Raiders
 Obert Logan, former NFL safety for the Dallas Cowboys and the New Orleans Saints
 Tom Sestak, former AFL defensive tackle for the Buffalo Bills

References

External links
 Gonzales ISD

Public high schools in Texas
Schools in Gonzales County, Texas